Accidental Farmer is a television comedy drama by broadcast on BBC1 on 21 December 2010. 

It is about a London-based advertising executive who moves to a farm in Yorkshire after buying it with her boyfriend's credit card as revenge for cheating on her; and the rigours and problems she encounters on the farm, particularly from being unfamiliar with the rural setting. It is a comedy drama starring Ashley Jensen as the main character, Erin Taylor.

Cast

Ashley Jensen as Erin Taylor
Michael Hodgson as Clive
Jean Heywood as Olive
Sylvestra Le Touzel as Judith
Shaun Dooley as Matt
Raza Jaffrey as Mike
Sally Phillips as Kat
Robert Pugh as Dr Willis
Lynda Baron as Mrs Hobbs

Ratings 
The pilot pulled in 4.575 million viewers, a 17.7% share between 9pm and 10pm.

References

External links
 
 

BBC television dramas
Television shows set in Yorkshire
2010 in British television